The barred mudskipper (Periophthalmus argentilineatus) or silverlined mudskipper is a species of mudskippers native to marine, fresh and brackish waters from the African coast of the Indian Ocean to the Marianas and Samoa in the western Pacific Ocean and from the Ryukyus south to Australia.  This species occurs in mangrove forests and nipa palm stands and can cross surfaces of mud while out of the water.  This species can reach a length of  TL.  It can also be found in the aquarium trade.

Parasites of the barred mudskipper include Acanthocephalan larvae and the small Opecoelid Digenean (Opegaster ouemoensis) parasite in the intestine and described from fish collected in New Caledonia.

References

External links 
 Fishes of Australia : Periophthalmus argentilineatus
 

barred mudskipper
Marine fish of Northern Australia
barred mudskipper
Taxa named by Achille Valenciennes